Harry Martin is the name of:
Harry B. Martin (1873–1959), American cartoonist and golf writer
Harry C. Martin (1854–1917), Wisconsin politician
Harry L. Martin (1911–1945), soldier
Harry S. Martin (born 1943), librarian and professor
Henry Martin (socialist) (1864–1951), known as Harry, British socialist
Harry Martin (field hockey) (born 1992), British field hockey player
Harry Martin (cyclist) (1889–1922), Canadian cyclist
Harry Martin (judge) (1920–2015), former Associate Justice of the North Carolina Supreme Court
Harry Martin (urologist) (1890–1961), medical director of 20th Century Fox Studios and third husband of Louella Parsons

See also
Harry Martin (Shortland Street)
Henry Martin (disambiguation)
Harold Martin (disambiguation)